All Souls Church, also known as All Souls Unitarian Universalist Church of Braintree, is a church on the National Register of Historic Places, it is located at 196 Elm Street in Braintree, Massachusetts. The building is a large fieldstone structure, in a cruciform plan with a square tower that has a crenellated top.  The gable ends are decorated with bargeboard, and the entrance is set under a gabled entry porch below a large window with Gothic tracery.  The church was designed by Boston architect Edwin Lewis and built in 1905 for a congregation organized in 1900; it is Braintree's first stone church building.  Land for the building was donated by George O. Wales, a leading force in uniting Braintree's Unitarian and Universalist congregations.

The building was listed on the National Register of Historic Places in 2015.

See also
National Register of Historic Places listings in Norfolk County, Massachusetts

References

External links
 All Souls Braintree official website

Churches in Norfolk County, Massachusetts
Churches on the National Register of Historic Places in Massachusetts
National Register of Historic Places in Norfolk County, Massachusetts
Unitarian Universalist churches in Massachusetts